Agriomorpha fusca is common species of damselfly in the flatwing damselfly family Rhipidolestidae. It is commonly known as the Chinese yellowface. Agriomorpha fusca rest with its wings folded while many related damselfies rest with their wings spread flat. This species is found in China (Guangdong, Guangxi, Hong Kong, and Hainan).

References 

Calopterygoidea
Insects described in 1933